Olędzkie  is a village in the administrative district of Gmina Brańsk, within Bielsk County, Podlaskie Voivodeship, in north-eastern Poland.

According to the 1921 census, the village was inhabited by 206 people, among whom 195 were Roman Catholic, 3 were Orthodox, and 8 were Mosaic. At the same time, all inhabitants declared Polish nationality. There were 47 residential buildings in the village.

References

Villages in Bielsk County